Ziaur is a given name. Notable people with the name include:

Ziaur Rahman (1936–1981), Bangladeshi war hero, politician and statesman
Ziaur Rahman (born 1972), medical scientist from India
Ziaur Rahman (chess player) (born 1974), chess player from Bangladesh
Ziaur Rahman (cricketer) (born 1986), cricketer from Bangladesh
Ziaur Rahman Ziaur (born 1981), Bangladeshi kabaddi player
Ziaur Rashid, cricketer from Bangladesh